Nashville National Cemetery is a United States National Cemetery located in Madison, a suburb of Nashville, in Davidson County, Tennessee. Administered by the United States Department of Veterans Affairs, it encompasses , and as of the end of 2005, had over 34,000 interments.

History 

The initial land for Nashville National Cemetery was acquired in July 1866.  A tract of 45 acres was transferred to the United States from Morton B. Howell, Clerk and Master of the Chancery Court of Davidson County, in accordance with a decree of the court in the case of Anderson v. McRoberts & McKee, docket # 2153.  The deed was recorded in January 1867, Davidson County deed book 38, p. 648. Another 17 acres was conveyed by the Clerk and Master, from the same case, in January 1867 and recorded in Davidson County deed book 38, p. 650. In October 1879 a small tract was deeded from J. Watts Judson and recorded in Davidson County deed book 63, p. 360.

The original interments were transferred from the Nashville City Cemetery, veteran hospital cemeteries around the region, as well as battlefield cemeteries, such as those from the Battle of Franklin. There are over four thousand unknowns buried in Nashville National Cemetery.

Nashville National Cemetery was listed in the National Register of Historic Places in 1996.

Notable interments 
 Medal of Honor recipients
 Private Charles P. Cantrell, for action during the Spanish–American War
 Private John Carr, for action during the Indian Wars
 Corporal William Franklin Lyell, for action during Korean War
 Others
 Chaplain Erastus M. Cravath, one of the founders of Fisk University
 Augustus Herman Pettibone, US Congressman
 Barry A. Sadler, Vietnam War veteran, and writer of the song Ballad of the Green Berets.
 Bob Schultz, American baseball player
 Teddy & Doyle Wilburn, brothers and country music stars

References

External links

 National Cemetery Administration
 Nashville National Cemetery
 Civil War Trails
 
 
 

Cemeteries in Nashville, Tennessee
Historic American Landscapes Survey in Tennessee
United States national cemeteries
1866 establishments in Tennessee
Cemeteries on the National Register of Historic Places in Tennessee
National Register of Historic Places in Nashville, Tennessee